Southern Ural - the south, the widest part of the Ural Mountains, stretches from the river Ufa (near the village of Lower Ufaley) to the Ural River. From the west and east the Southern Ural is limited to the East European, West Siberian Plain and the steppes near Aral Sea and Caspian sea.

Geography

The relief of the Southern Urals is complex, with numerous valleys and parallel ridges directed south-west and meridionally. The range includes the Ilmensky Mountains separated from the main ridges by the Miass River. Other notable peaks lie along the Iremel mountain ridge (Bolshoy Iremel and Maly Iremel), the Nurgush, highest point , and the Nakas, highest point . The Southern Urals extend some  up to the sharp westward bend of the Ural River and terminate in the wide Mugodzhar Hills.

The Southern Urals include lakes such as Zyuratkul.

References

Geographical regions

Mountain ranges of Russia
Mountain ranges of Kazakhstan
Landforms of Siberia
Landforms of Bashkortostan
Landforms of Chelyabinsk Oblast
Landforms of Khanty-Mansi Autonomous Okrug
Landforms of Sverdlovsk Oblast
Landforms of Tyumen Oblast
Geography of Aktobe Region
Geology of European Russia
Geology of Siberia
Mountain ranges of Asia
Mountain ranges of Europe
Physiographic divisions
History of Ural